SS Samvigna was a Liberty ship built in the United States during World War II. She was transferred to the British Ministry of War Transportation (MoWT) upon completion.

Construction
Samvigna was laid down on 22 February 1944, under a Maritime Commission (MARCOM) contract, MC hull 2353, by J.A. Jones Construction, Brunswick, Georgia; sponsored by Mrs. Alexandra G. Brown, and launched on 8 April 1944.

History
She was allocated to Hain Steamship, on 20 April 1944. On 30 June 1948, she was laid up in the National Defense Reserve Fleet, in Mobile, Alabama. She was sold to Southern Scrap Material Co., Ltd., 18 February 1960, for $70,150, for scrapping. She was removed from the fleet on 21 March 1960.

References

Bibliography

 
 
 
 
 

 

Liberty ships
Ships built in Brunswick, Georgia
1944 ships
Mobile Reserve Fleet
Liberty ships transferred to the British Ministry of War Transport